Bellmaking may refer to:
 Bellfounding, the casting bells in a foundry for use in churches, clocks, and public buildings
 The process of making the large open bell end in Brass instrument construction